Stockton is a village and civil parish  south east of Shrewsbury, in the Shropshire district, in the county of Shropshire, England. The parish includes the village of Norton and the hamlet of Higford. In 2011, the parish had a population of 331. The parish touches Astley Abbotts, Badger, Barrow, Beckbury, Broseley, Sutton Maddock and Worfield.

Landmarks 
There are 20 listed buildings in Stockton. Stockton has a church called St Chad.

History 
The name "Stockton" probably means 'farm/settlement associated with an outlying farm/settlement'. Stockton was recorded in the Domesday Book as Stochetone.

References 

Villages in Shropshire
Civil parishes in Shropshire